"Sparkles" is a song by Dutch disc jockey and producer DJ Tiësto. It was released in November 1999 in the Netherlands. Several versions of the song appear on 3 DJ Tiësto's compilations: Magik Four: A New Adventure (original version), In Search of Sunrise (Magikal Remake) and Summerbreeze (Transa remix).

Track listing 
 12" / Digital Download (Netherlands)
 "Sparkles" (Airscape Remix)- 8:03
 "Sparkles" (Original) - 7:45
 "Sparkles" (Magikal Remake) - 8:41

 12" / Digital Download (UK)
 "Sparkles" (Transa Remix) - 8:10
 "Sparkles" (Original Mix) - 7:45
 "Sparkles" (Airscape Remix) - 8:01
 "Sparkles" (Sparecase Remix) - 7:57

 12" (Germany)
 "Sparkles" (Transa Remix) - 8:10
 "Sparkles" (Airscape Remix) - 8:01
 "Sparkles" (Starcase Remix) - 7:57
 "Sparkles" (Original) - 7:45

 12" / CD / Digital Download - Remixes (Netherlands)
 "Sparkles" (Transa Remix) - 8:10
 "Sparkles" (Airscape Remix) - 8:03
 "Sparkles" (Starcase Remix) - 7:57

 CD Maxi Single (Netherlands)
 "Sparkles" (Radio Edit) - 4:25
 "Sparkles" (Airscape Remix) - 8:03
 "Sparkles" (Original Version) - 7:27
 "Sparkles" (Magikal Remake) - 8:41

 CD Single (Netherlands)
 "Sparkles" (Radio Edit) - 4:25
 "Sparkles" (Airscape Remix) - 8:03

 12" - Airscape Remix (UK, 2004)
 "Sparkles" (Airscape Instrumental Edit) - 3:18
 "Sparkles" (Airscape Vocal Edit) - 3:19

Charts

2000

2004 reissue

References 

1999 songs
1999 singles
Tiësto songs
Songs written by Tiësto